Elk Grove is an unincorporated community located in the town of Elk Grove, Lafayette County, Wisconsin, United States.

James V. Holland (1835-1916), Wisconsin State Representative and businessman, was born in Elk Grove.

Notes

Unincorporated communities in Lafayette County, Wisconsin
Unincorporated communities in Wisconsin